Yuriy Ihorovych Andrukhovych is a Ukrainian prose writer, poet, essayist, and translator. His English pen name is Yuri Andrukhovych.

Biography
In 1985, Andrukhovych co-founded the Bu-Ba-Bu poetic group, which stands for «burlesque, side-show, buffoonery» (Ukrainian: бурлеск, балаган, буфонада) together with Oleksandr Irvanets and Viktor Neborak. Yuriy Andrukhovych is the father of the Ukrainian writer Sofia Andrukhovych.

Andruhovych's works have been translated and published in Poland, Germany, Canada, Hungary, Finland, Croatia (separate books), USA, Sweden, Spain, Russia‚ Austria (separate publications).

Translations of Y. Andrukhovich's works into foreign languages were published by the following publishing houses: Wydawnictwo Czarne (Poland), Suhrkamp Verlag (Germany), Knihovna Listů, Fra, Vĕtrné Mlyny (Czech Republic), BAUM, Kalligram, Absynt (Slovakia), József Attila Kör, Ráció, Gondolat (Hungary), Polirom, ALLFA (Romania), Klio (Serbia), Cankarjeva Založba (Slovenia), Fraktura (Croatia), "Парадокс" (Bulgaria), "Македонска реч" (North Macedonia).

Political views
Andrukhovych writes in Ukrainian and is known for his pro-Ukrainian and pro-European views. In his interviews, he said that he respected both the Ukrainian and Russian languages and claims that his opponents do not understand that the very survival of the Ukrainian language is threatened. During the 2004 presidential elections in Ukraine he signed, together with eleven other writers, an open letter in which he called Sovietic Russian culture: "language of pop music and criminal slang".

Literary work
To date, Andrukhovych has published five novels, four poetry collections, a cycle of short stories, and two volumes of essays, as well as literary translations from English, German, Polish, and Russian. Some of his writings for example, The Moscoviad and Perverzion were carried out in a distinct postmodern style. A list of some of his major works includes:
The Sky and Squares (Небо і площі, 1985), a book of poems
On the Left, Where the Heart Is (Зліва, де серце, 1989), a cycle of short stories
Downtown (Середмістя, 1989), a book of poems
Exotic Birds and Plants (Екзотичні птахи і рослини, 1991), a book of poems
Recreations (Рекреації, 1992), first novel
The Moscoviad, (Московіада, 1993), a novel
Perverzion (Перверзія, 1996), a novel
Disorientation on Location (Дезорієнтація на місцевості, 1999), a book of essays
My Europe (Моя Європа, 2001), a book of essays co-authored with the Polish writer Andrzej Stasiuk
Twelve Rings (Дванадцять обручів, 2003), a novel
Songs for the Dead Rooster (Пісні для мертвого півня, 2004), a book of poems
The Day Mrs Day Died (День смерті Пані День, 2006), an anthology of Ukrainian translations of American poetry from the 1950s and 1960s
The Devil's Hiding in the Cheese (Диявол ховається в сирі, 2006), a book of essays
The Secret. Instead of a Novel (Таємниця. Замість роману, 2007), a novel made up of interviews
 "Majdan! Ukraine, Europa", 2014, collection of essays with Yaroslav Hrytsak and others (in German).
 "Lovers of Justice", (Коханці юстиції, 2017), a novel
 Radio Night, (Радіо Ніч, 2020), a novel

Awards and honors

For his literary writings and activity as a public intellectual, Andrukhovych has been awarded numerous national and international prizes, including the Herder Prize (2001), the Erich Maria Remarque Peace Prize (2005), the Leipzig Book Award for European Understanding (2006), the Angelus Award (2006), the Hannah Arendt Prize (2014), and the Goethe Medal (2016).

He is a member of the editorial board of Ukrainian periodicals Krytyka and Potyah 76. He is also a juror for the Zbigniew Herbert International Literary Award.

References

External links

 Virtual card 
 Who is who – Andrukhovych Yurii (from internet-magazine Vgolos) (in Ukrainian)
 Biography from the international literature festival berlin 
 Yurii Andrukhovych essays in Dzerkalo Tyzhnia
 Selected poetry by Andrukhovych in Ukrainian
 Biography page for Andrukhovych at the website of his German publisher, Suhrkamp
 The information page on Andrukhovych at the website of the Canadian Institute of Ukrainian Studies Press, which published the English translation of his first novel, Recreations
 Andrukhovych's acceptance speech for the Leipzig Book Prize for European Understanding
 An Open Letter from Twelve Apolitical Writers about Choice and the Elections
 Author's reading of selected poetry and prose extracts, and interview in Ukrainian and English at the Kennan Institute, USA, 2009

1960 births
Living people
Writers from Ivano-Frankivsk
Ukrainian Academy of Printing alumni
Ukrainian male poets
Postmodern writers
Ukrainian translators
Ukrainian non-fiction writers
Ukrainian essayists
Male essayists
Ukrainian male writers
Translators of William Shakespeare
Herder Prize recipients
Counterculture of the 1990s